Zaïnoul Bah (born 24 April 1984) is an Ivorian-French former basketball player. Bah had a long professional career, playing for clubs in France and Switzerland.

References 

1984 births
Living people
People from Choisy-le-Roi
Birmingham–Southern Panthers men's basketball players
French expatriate basketball people in the United States
French men's basketball players
Shooting guards